Puszczykowo  is a town in Poznań County, Poland, with 9,331 inhabitants (as of 2015). From 1934–54, there was a rural village Puszczykowo. From 1975–98 the town administratively belonged to the regional capital Poznań.

History
The first time Puszczykowo name appears in written sources in the form of Posczucowo was in 1387, although Niwka, a settlement within the town limits was mentioned as early as 1302. Residential buildings, characteristic of present-day town date from the close of the 19th century. The railway line leading to Wroclaw and station building were built in 1856. In the Interwar period the excursion traffic on Sundays and holidays was so great that trains from Poznań ran every 10 minutes. To avoid interference with the long-distance traffic an additional track had to be built for them. Also popular were steamboat trips. In the 1950s the steamboat, "Janek Krasicki", in later years, motorboat "Dziwożona" cruised from Poznań to Puszczykowo. The chief of the city between 1968–84 was Wladyslaw Krzyżański. In those years, many public buildings were built. In the 1970s, on Warta fields a hospital was built. Since 1998, a tourist route, called the Kórnik Route was established in Puszczykowo. In 2012 tennis player Angelique Kerber moved to Puszczykowo.

Education
The town offers education in two primary schools and a secondary school.

Notable residents
Cyryl Ratajski (1875-1942), President of the City of Poznań, Minister of Internal Affairs, Delegate of the Polish government-in-exile
Arkady Fiedler (1894-1985), Polish writer, journalist and adventurer
Angelique Kerber (born 1988), tennis player

Sister cities
 Châteaugiron, France

References

External links

 
 

Cities and towns in Greater Poland Voivodeship
Poznań County